Alex Johnston (born 14 January 1995)  is a professional rugby league footballer who plays as a er and  for the South Sydney Rabbitohs in the NRL.

He played for the Indigenous All Stars and the Prime Minister's XIII at representative level, and won the 2014 NRL Grand Final with the South Sydney club.  Johnston is in the top 10 try scorers of all time in Australian rugby league.

Background
Johnston was born in Sydney, New South Wales, Australia, and has ancestry from Lumi, Sandaun Province, Papua New Guinea and Saibai Island in the Torres Strait.

He played his junior rugby league for La Perouse United and attended Endeavour Sports High School (where he completed the HSC) before being signed by the South Sydney Rabbitohs. As a youngster, Johnston played for the New South Wales Under 16s and 18s teams and Australian Schoolboys team. In 2013, Johnston played for the South Sydney Rabbitohs' S. G. Ball Cup and NYC teams before moving on to the Rabbitohs' New South Wales Cup team, North Sydney Bears in 2014.

Playing career

2014
He continued to perform on both the left and right wing throughout the year. At times, Johnston was referred to as the successor of Greg Inglis, for his ability to play fullback as well as wing. In round 21, Johnston scored his first ever hat-trick against the Newcastle Knights in the Rabbitohs 50–10 victory. On 5 October 2014, in Souths 2014 NRL Grand Final against the Canterbury-Bankstown Bulldogs, Johnston played on the wing and scored the first try of the match to lead the South Sydney Rabbitohs 30–6 victory. Johnston finished his brilliant debut year in the NRL as being the competitions highest tryscorer of the 2014 NRL season with 21 tries in 18 matches. In September 2014, Johnston received an offer to play for his maternal grandmother's native . 

On 14 October 2014, Johnston was selected for the Australia Kangaroos 2014 Four Nations squad but didn't make an appearance in any of Australia's four matches.

2015
On 13 February 2015, Johnston played on the wing for the Indigenous All Stars against the NRL All Stars in the 2015 All Stars match at Cbus Super Stadium, the Indigenous side winning 20–6. On 23 February, he played for the Rabbitohs in the 2015 World Club Challenge match against 2014 Super League Grand Final premiers St. Helens, playing on the wing in the Rabbitohs' 39–0 win at Langtree Park. For the 2015 Anzac Test, he was selected to make his debut for Australia against New Zealand, playing on the wing in the Kangaroos' 12–26 loss at Suncorp Stadium. On 13 May, he re-signed with South Sydney on a 2-year contract to the end of the 2017 season. On 8 July, he was selected to be 18th man for the New South Wales team for Game 3 of the 2015 State of Origin series. He finished off the 2015 season as South Sydney's highest try-scorer with 17 tries in 25 matches. On 26 September, he played for the Prime Minister's XIII against Papua New Guinea, playing on the wing and scoring a try in his team's 40–12 win at Port Moresby. On 15 December, he was named on the wing for the Indigenous All Stars team to play the World All Stars on 13 February 2016.

2016
On 13 January, Johnston was named in the emerging New South Wales Blues squad. In February, he played for South Sydney in the 2016 NRL Auckland Nines, scoring the opening try of the competition. He was selected on the wing and scored four tries in South Sydney's first three matches of the season before sustaining a hamstring injury that saw him sit out for several weeks. In his return game in round 10 against the Parramatta Eels, he played in his preferred position at fullback in a 22–20 win. He was renamed in the fullback position in round 15, once again against the Eels. He was then moved back and forth as the club attempted to find a line-up that would win them. In round 23, Johnston played on the wing when South Sydney broke their nine-game losing streak with a 41–22 win over the New Zealand Warriors. He played their for the next three final games which were all won by South Sydney. Johnston finished the 2016 season with 11 tries from 18 matches

2017 
In round 1 of the 2017 season, South Sydney fullback, Greg Inglis suffered what was deemed to be a season-ending injury to his anterior cruciate ligament (ACL) in the club's 18–34 defeat by the Wests Tigers. In round 2, Johnston was named at fullback for the club's clash with the Manly-Warringah Sea Eagles. Johnston scored two tries in the position in his sides' 18–38 win at Brookvale Oval. On 14 June he re-signed with the South Sydney club until the end of the 2020 season. On 2 July he scored five tries against Penrith to be the first Sourhs player since Nathan Merritt in 2011 to achieve five tries in a match. In round 21, Alex Johnston was switched back to fullback after poor performances by Souths who were on a three-game losing streak. He scored an amazing try in South Sydney's 32 - 18 loss against Canberra. He then went on to score six tries in his next three games and was the leading try scorer with 2 rounds to go. However, against the New Zealand Warriors in round 24, Johnston injured his hamstring as he was scoring a try in the 36 - 18 win. He was ruled out for the rest of the season, with South Sydney losing their last two matches. Johnston finished season 2017 with him playing 22 matches and scoring 22 tries, the second highest tryscorer that year.

2018
Johnston was part of the South Sydney side which returned to form in 2018 finishing 3rd on the table at the end of the regular season.  Johnston made 24 appearances for Souths scoring 8 tries as the club finished one game short of the grand final losing to Eastern Suburbs 12–4.

2019
Johnston began the 2019 NRL season as South Sydney's first choice fullback.  South Sydney started the year off winning 8 of their first 9 games.  Following Souths 19–18 loss against Penrith in round 14, Johnston was ruled out with a knee injury.  In round 24, Johnston returned to the Souths side and scored a try as they defeated the New Zealand Warriors 31–10 at Mt. Smart Stadium.

At the end of the 2019 regular season, Souths finished third on the table and qualified for the finals.  Johnston scored a try in the club's 34–26 victory over Manly-Warringah in the semi-final at ANZ Stadium.  The following week, Johnston played in South Sydney's preliminary final loss against the Canberra Raiders at Canberra Stadium.

2020
In round 12 of the 2020 NRL season, Johnston scored a hat-trick as South Sydney defeated St. George 32–24 at Kogarah Oval.

In round 14, Johnston scored two tries as South Sydney defeated North Queensland 31–30 at the Queensland Country Bank Stadium.

The following week, Johnston scored two tries as Souths defeated Manly-Warringah 56–16 at ANZ Stadium.

On 9 September, Johnston signed a two-year contract extension to stay at South Sydney.  It ended months of speculation about the players future as he had been linked to Melbourne, Wests Tigers and North Queensland.

In the final round of the 2020 NRL season, Johnston scored five tries as Souths defeated bitter rivals the Sydney Roosters 60–8 at ANZ Stadium.

In the 2020 elimination final, Johnston scored two tries for Souths in their 46–20 victory over Newcastle at ANZ Stadium.

Johnston made a total of 22 appearances throughout the season as Souths reached their third straight preliminary final but lost 20–16 against Penrith.  Johnston finished as the year's top try scorer with 23 tries.

2021
In round 1 of the 2021 NRL season, he scored two tries in a 26–18 loss against Melbourne.

In round 12, Johnston scored a hat-trick in South Sydney's 38–20 victory over Parramatta.

In round 14, Johnston scored his second hat-trick of the season in a 24–10 victory over Newcastle.
The following week, he scored two tries for South Sydney in a 46–0 victory over Brisbane.
In round 16, he scored two tries in a 38–22 victory over Wests Tigers at an empty Leichhardt Oval, which took Johnston to the top of the try scorers list.

In round 17, Johnston scored a hat-trick during South Sydney's 46–18 victory over North Queensland.

In round 18, he scored two tries for South Sydney in a 32–24 victory over Canterbury.

On 19 July, Johnston was ruled out from playing for a month with a hamstring injury.

In round 24, Johnson scored a hat-trick during South Sydney's 54–12 victory over arch-rivals the Sydney Roosters.

In the 2021 Finals Series, Johnston scored two tries for South Sydney in their preliminary final victory over Manly which booked Souths a place in the grand final for only the second time since their 1971 triumph.
On 27 September, Johnston was awarded the Ken Irvine Medal for being the league's top try scorer with 27 tries. Johnston scored his 30th try for the season (including finals) in South Sydney's 2021 NRL Grand Final loss to Penrith.  In doing so, he broke the record for most tries scored by a Souths player in a season which was held by Les Brennan for over 60 years.

On 18 October, Johnston signed a contract extension with the South Sydney club until at least the end of the 2025 season.

2022
In round 6 of the 2022 NRL season, he scored two tries in South Sydney's 36–16 victory over Canterbury.

In round 12 of the 2022 NRL season, he scored a hat-trick in South Sydney's 44–18 victory over West Tigers to become South Sydney's all-time leading try scorer.

In round 14, Johnston scored a hat-trick in South Sydney's victory over the Gold Coast.

In round 16, Johnston scored two tries in a 30–12 victory over Parramatta.  In round 19, Johnston scored two tries for South Sydney in their 24–12 victory over Melbourne.

In round 20, Johnston scored one try in a 21–20 loss to Cronulla to enter the top 10 try scorers in NRL history.

Johnston played a total of 25 matches for South Sydney across the season but he missed the clubs preliminary final defeat to eventual premiers Penrith through injury.  Johnston finished as the competitions top try scorer with 30 tries.

References

External links
South Sydney Rabbitohs profile
Rabbitohs profile

1995 births
Living people
Australia national rugby league team players
Australian people of Papua New Guinean descent
Australian rugby league players
Indigenous All Stars players
Indigenous Australian rugby league players
North Sydney Bears NSW Cup players
Papua New Guinea national rugby league team players
People educated at Endeavour Sports High School
Prime Minister's XIII players
Rugby league fullbacks
Rugby league players from Sydney
Rugby league wingers
South Sydney Rabbitohs players
Torres Strait Islanders